Dean Arthur Deetz (born November 29, 1993) is an American professional baseball pitcher who is a free agent. He was drafted by the Houston Astros in the 11th round of the 2014 Major League Baseball Draft. Deetz made his Major League Baseball (MLB) debut in 2018.

Career
Deetz attended Nixa High School in Nixa, Missouri and played college baseball at the Northeastern Oklahoma A&M College.

Houston Astros
He was drafted by the Houston Astros in the 11th round of the 2014 Major League Baseball Draft.

Deetz made his professional debut with the Greeneville Astros where he pitched to an 8.88 ERA and 2–4 record in 13 games. He played 2015 with the Tri-City ValleyCats and Quad Cities River Bandits, posting a combined 9–3 record and 1.70 ERA in 63.2 innings pitched between the two clubs, and 2016 with the Lancaster JetHawks and Corpus Christi Hooks, where he went a combined 8–5 with a 3.76 ERA between both teams. He started 2017 with Corpus Christi and was promoted to the Fresno Grizzlies during the season. After going 7–6 with a 4.25 ERA in 16 games between Corpus Christi and Fresno,
the Astros added him to their 40-man roster after the season.

Deetz made his MLB debut on September 5, 2018. He split the 2019 season between the GCL Astros, Corpus Christi, and Round Rock Express, going a combined 3–0 with a 6.63 ERA over 38 innings. On January 9, 2020, Deetz was designated for assignment, and outrighted on to the minors on January 16. Deetz did not play in a game in 2020 due to the cancellation of the minor league season because of the COVID-19 pandemic. He became a free agent on November 2, 2020.

Kansas City Monarchs
On May 17, 2021, Deetz signed with the Kansas City Monarchs of the American Association of Professional Baseball. Deetz was released on June 1 after recording an 18.00 ERA in 2 appearances.

Sioux Falls Canaries
On May 11, 2022, Deetz signed with the Sioux Falls Canaries of the American Association of Professional Baseball. In 2022, Deetz recorded a 0–0 record and 297.00 ERA in 2 appearances with the Canaries. On June 4, 2022, Deetz was released by the Canaries.

References

External links

1993 births
Living people
People from Nixa, Missouri
Baseball players from Missouri
Major League Baseball pitchers
Houston Astros players
Northeastern Oklahoma A&M Golden Norsemen baseball players
Gulf Coast Astros players
Greeneville Astros players
Tri-City ValleyCats players
Quad Cities River Bandits players
Lancaster JetHawks players
Corpus Christi Hooks players
Fresno Grizzlies players
Mesa Solar Sox players
Round Rock Express players
Kansas City Monarchs players
21st-century African-American sportspeople
Sioux Falls Canaries players